Varcheshmeh is a village in Qaleh Qafeh Rural District, in the Central District of Minudasht County, Golestan Province, Iran. At the 2006 census, its population was 216, in 50 families.

References 

Populated places in Minudasht County